Galunisertib (LY2157299) is a small molecular experimental cancer drug previously in development by Eli Lilly. It is a TGF-b inhibitor. Development of galunisertib by Eli Lilly was discontinued in January 2020.

Galunisertib was investigated in a phase II trial for treatment of hepatocellular carcinoma. Pre-clinically, combination of galunisertib with PD-L1 blockade resulted in improved tumor growth inhibition.

References 

Experimental cancer drugs